Terrimonas pekingensis is a Gram-negative, strictly aerobic, non-spore-forming and non-motile bacterium from the genus of Terrimonas which has been isolated from bulking sludge from a wastewater treatment plant from Beijing in China.

References

External links
Type strain of Terrimonas pekingensis at BacDive -  the Bacterial Diversity Metadatabase

Chitinophagia
Bacteria described in 2013